The 2007–08 NOJHL season is the 30th season of the Northern Ontario Junior Hockey League (NOJHL). The six teams of the East and West Divisions will play 50-game schedules.

Come February, the top teams of each division will play down for the Copeland-McNamara Trophy, the NOJHL championship.  The winner of the Copeland-McNamara Trophy will compete in the Central Canadian Junior "A" championship, the Dudley Hewitt Cup.  If successful against the winners of the Ontario Junior Hockey League and Superior International Junior Hockey League, the champion would then move on to play in the Canadian Junior Hockey League championship, the 2008 Royal Bank Cup.

Changes 
 Soo Eagles take one year's leave.

Final standings
Note: GP = Games played; W = Wins; L = Losses; OTL = Overtime losses; SL = Shootout losses; GF = Goals for; GA = Goals against; PTS = Points; x = clinched playoff berth; y = clinched division title; z = clinched conference title

Teams listed on the official league website.

Standings listed on official league website.

2007-08 Copeland-McNamara Trophy Playoffs

Playoff results are listed on the official league website.

Dudley Hewitt Cup Championship
Hosted by the Newmarket Hurricanes in Newmarket, Ontario.  Sudbury finished in fourth.

Round Robin
Newmarket Hurricanes (OPJHL) 5 - Sudbury Wolves 1
Oakville Blades (OPJHL) 5 - Sudbury Wolves 3
Dryden Ice Dogs (SIJHL) 4 - Sudbury Wolves 0

Scoring leaders 
Note: GP = Games played; G = Goals; A = Assists; Pts = Points; PIM = Penalty minutes

Leading goaltenders 
Note: GP = Games played; Mins = Minutes played; W = Wins; L = Losses: OTL = Overtime losses; SL = Shootout losses; GA = Goals Allowed; SO = Shutouts; GAA = Goals against average

Awards
 Player of the Year - Mussel Morin (Abitibi Eskimos)
 Most Valuable Player - Jeremie Dorval (Abitibi Eskimos)
 Most Gentlemanly Player - Adam Pyymaki (Soo Thunderbirds)
 Rookie of the Year - Jarret Burton (Blind River Beavers)
 Top Defenceman - Ben Davey (Soo Thunderbirds)
 Most Improved Player - Dan Vernelli (Soo Thunderbirds)
 Top Defensive Forward - Kody Carnevale (North Bay Skyhawks)
 Top "Team Player" - Brandon Ingraham (Manitoulin Islanders)
 Director of the Year - Al Jones (Soo Thunderbirds)
 Coach of the Year - Paul Gagne (Abitibi Eskimos)
 Team Goaltending Award - Ryan Dube, Travis O'Brien (Soo Thunderbirds)
 Top Goals Against Average - Miles Williams (Abitibi Eskimos)
 Scoring Champion - Scott Restoule (Sudbury Jr. Wolves)
 Playoff Most Valuable Player - Joey Delwo (Sudbury Jr. Wolves)

See also 
 2008 Royal Bank Cup
 Dudley Hewitt Cup
 List of NOHA Junior A seasons
 Ontario Junior Hockey League
 Superior International Junior Hockey League
 Greater Ontario Junior Hockey League

References

External links 
 Official website of the Northern Ontario Junior Hockey League
 Official website of the Canadian Junior Hockey League

NOJHL
Northern Ontario Junior Hockey League seasons